Stian Carstensen (born 5 January 1971) is a multi-instrument Norwegian musician, entertainer and with Jarle Vespestad (drums) and Nils-Olav Johansen (vocal and guitar), central members of the Balkan-jazz orchestra Farmers market.

Biography 
Carstensen was born in Eidsvoll and began playing the accordion at the age of nine. He first learned from his father, and later from a classical player which he attended for four years. During this time he played in Norwegian TV, radio, festivals etc. He also toured in America, playing classical music. At the same time he was into swing jazz, and played standard tunes with his father, who was also a bass player.

When Carstensen was 15 he started to play electric guitar in a rock band. After a while he resumed his interest in jazz and formed a trio with some local artists. He went freelance for a year or so and then he began to study in the Jazz Program at the Trondheim Musikkonservatorium, with the guitar as a main instrument. During his two years of study in Trondheim (1991–93), he formed the group Farmers Market. The group was originally a free jazz quintet, until they one day found sheet music with a Bulgarian folk tune in 11/16. This was a great experience for the band members and they practiced day and night to be able to play this asymmetrical music.

After a while Carstensen went to Bulgaria and visited villages there to collect and study the local folk music. The result of the tour was a live record, Speed/Balkan/Boogie, with singers and musicians from the famous "Le mysteres des voix bulgares" recorded at Molde International Jazz Festival in Norway. After this he was totally dedicated to the Bulgarian music. He toured a lot with musicians from Bulgaria and Romania, and learned a lot from them.

Besides of being dedicated to this kind of music, he also took lessons in Composition, learned to play the 5-string banjo in bluegrass style, played with various jazz groups (be-bop, and experimental) with Jon Christensen and Bendik Hofseth to mention some.

In 1997 Farmers Market made their second album, Music from the Hybrides, with saxophonist Trifon Trifonov from Bulgaria. This was an extreme album with elements of many different styles and ideas from bluegrass in odd meters to Metallica-like versions of traditional Balkan tunes and slick commercial music mixed with Stockhausen. The album got very good reviews from many contemporary music magazines as well as rock, folk and jazz magazines in Europe.

In 1998 Carstensen was invited to write commissioned work for Vossajazz Norwegian Jazz Festival at Voss. He wrote some music and put together a band consisting of his colleague Jarle Vespestad, a leading Norwegian drummer who also play in Farmers Market, with Django Bates from England, with Tord Gustavsen Trio from Norway, and Ernst Reijseger from the Netherlands. The music was performed in April 1998, with great success. The choice of musicians was made carefully, because they each had one thing in common; they were into a lot of styles at the same time. The music was composed in a contemporary spirit, but contained elements from many different styles without being artificial.

This seems to be a highlight in Carstensen's career, and he has been working a lot with that ensemble after this. Another highlight was his release of the new record Farmers Market on the German label Winter & Winter, he toured Europe and Japan with this band in 2000. They received very good reviews both for the album and the concert in magazines such as The Wire, Rolling Stone among others. Farmers Market has also played at the world's biggest jazz festival, the North Sea Jazz Festival in The Hague, the Netherlands.

Carstensen also played with Dutch cello player Ernst Reijseger. They work as a duo, playing only self-written stuff in various improvisational folk styles.

He has studied Bulgarian polyphony in Bulgaria, and rural American Afro-Celtic music in the Appalachians, on a fee from the Norwegian cultural department. He is currently on a two-year state fee to study Bulgarian traditional music. His instruments are: accordion, kaval (Bulgarian flute), bagpipes, guitar, violin, mandolin & banjo.

He played the accordionist in the circus band (and the soundtrack) of the 2005 Neil Gaiman, Dave McKean film MirrorMask.

In 2000 Carstensen recorded his solo album, with only his own compositions for Winter & Winter, to be released in 26 countries.

John Kellman of All About Jazz recognized Carstensen's commission Flip for Vossajazz March 2013, as no. 1 of his "Best Live Shows of 2013".

Discography (in selection)

Solo albums 
2004: Backwards Into The Backwoods (Winter & Winter)

2021: Musical Sanatorium (Grappa Musikkforlag)

Collaborations 
With Farmers Market
(Stian Carstensen, Trifon Trifonov, Nils-Olav Johansen, Finn Guttormsen, Jarle Vespestad)
1995: Speed/Balkan/Boogie (Kirkelig Kulturverksted)
1997: Musikk fra Hybridene (Music From The Hybrides) (Kirkelig Kulturverksted)
2000: Farmers Market (Winter & Winter), nominated for This year's jazz records 2001 in Norway
2008: Surfin' USSR (Ipecac/Tuba)
2012: Slav to the Rhythm (Division)

With Frode Alnæs & Arild Andersen
1998: Sommerbrisen (Kirkelig Kulturverksted)
2003: Julegløggen (Kirkelig Kulturverksted)
2006: Høstsløv (Kirkelig Kulturverksted)

With Iain Ballamy
2000: Pepper St. Interludes (Feral Records), featuring Stian Carstensen with special guests: Norma Winstone, Martin France, Matthew Sharp
2004: The Little Radio (Sound Recordings)

With Kaizers Orchestra
2001: Ompa Til Du Dør (Broiler Farm)

Within Børre Dalhaug's «Bigbandblast»
2004: Bigbandblast! (Real Records)

Duo with Jimmy Rosenberg
2005: Rose Room (Hot Club Records)

With Eldbjørg Raknes
2005: Små Sanger Mest I Det Blå (Bergland Productions), including with Siri Gjære

With Mathias Eick
2007: The Door (ECM Records)

With  Tora Augestad's Music for a While including Mathias Eick, Martin Taxt and Pål Hausken
2007: Weill Variations (Grappa Music)
2012: Graces That Refrain (Grappa Music)
2014: Canticles of Winter (Grappa Music)

With Alexander Rybak & Mats Paulson
2011: Visa Vid Vindens Ängar (Grappa Music)

With Gammalgrass
2013: Obsolete Music 1 (Division Records)

References

External links 
Stian Carstensen Biography on Farmers Market official website
 Stian Carstensen potpurri on YouTube
Farmer's Market II on YouTube
Farmers Market - Steroid Train Trip (live, 2008) on YouTube
Kirsti Huke & Stian Carstensen - A Nightingale Sang in Berkeley Square (JazzLAB) on YouTube

Norwegian jazz pianists
20th-century Norwegian accordionists
21st-century Norwegian accordionists
20th-century Norwegian multi-instrumentalists
21st-century Norwegian multi-instrumentalists
Norwegian jazz guitarists
Norwegian jazz accordionists
Banjoists
Bagpipe players
Norwegian mandolinists
Norwegian violinists
Male violinists
Norwegian multi-instrumentalists
Norwegian musicians
Scandinavian musicians
Crossover (music)
Norwegian University of Science and Technology alumni
Musicians from Eidsvoll
1971 births
Living people
20th-century guitarists
21st-century Norwegian guitarists
Norwegian male pianists
21st-century pianists
21st-century violinists
20th-century Norwegian male musicians
21st-century Norwegian male musicians
Male jazz musicians
Farmers Market (band) members
Music for a While (band) members